Talvikki Ansel is an American poet. She was chosen as a winner by James Dickey, for the Yale Younger Poets Series in 1996.

Life 
She graduated from Mount Holyoke College in 1985, and Indiana University Bloomington.  Her poems have appeared in the anthologies New Young American Poets (Southern Illinois University, 2000) and The Pushcart Prize XXVI, and in magazines such as The Atlantic Monthly, The New Republic, The Journal, Poetry, Prairie Schooner, and Shenandoah.

She teaches at the University of Rhode Island.

Awards
 Lannan Foundation resident, Marfa, Spring 2006.
Stegner Fellowship in Creative Writing, from Stanford University
Virginia Commission for the Arts Fellowship.

Works
 World, The Atlantic Monthly, July/August 2001
 Bird Calls, Blackbird, Spring 2002
 Swallows, Blackbird, Spring 2002
 Seed Savers, Poetry Magazine, January/February 2007
 Mycorrhizae, Poetry, Volume CLXXXVI, Number 3 June 2005
 Tree List, Prairie Schooner, Mar 22, 2003
 Or Stay Again, Prairie Schooner, Mar 22, 2003
 Blue Collection, Prairie Schooner, Mar 22, 2003

Books
 My Shining Archipelago, Yale University Press, 1997. ,  
 Jetty Lincoln, Neb.: Zoo Press, 2003. ,

Reviews
With admirable economy, the title Jetty announces two significant features of Talvikki Ansel's second book: the liminal vantage-point of the narrators of these poems and the curious ways in which the human world intersects with the natural.

References

External links
Where Poetry Outgrows Hobby Status, BILL SLOCUM, The New York Times, June 22, 1997

Year of birth missing (living people)
Living people
Mount Holyoke College alumni
Indiana University Bloomington alumni
Stegner Fellows
University of Rhode Island faculty
American women poets
20th-century American poets
20th-century American women writers
21st-century American poets
21st-century American women writers
American women academics